India is a member of the South Asian Zone of the Olympic Council of Asia (OCA), and has participated in the Asian Games since their inception in 1951. The Indian Olympic Association, established in 1927, and recognised in the same year by the International Olympic Committee, is the National Olympic Committee for India.

India was one of the first five founding members of the Asian Games Federation on 13 February 1949, in New Delhi; the organisation was disbanded on 26 November 1981 and replaced by the Olympic Council of Asia.

Membership of Olympic Council of Asia
India is a member of the South Asian Zone of the Olympic Council of Asia, the governing body of all the sports in Asia, recognized by the International Olympic Committee as the continental association of Asia. Being a member of South Asian Zone, India also participates in the South Asian Games, sub-regional Games for South Asia.

The OCA organises five major continental-level multi-sport events: the Asian Summer Games (which are commonly known as the Asian Games), Asian Winter Games, Asian Indoor-Martial Arts Games, Asian Beach Games, and Asian Youth Games. Before 2009, Indoor and Martial Arts were two separate events for indoor and martial arts sports respectively. However, the OCA has since amalgamated them into a single event, the Asian Indoor-Martial Arts Games, which was debuted in 2013 in Incheon, South Korea. As a member of OCA, India is privileged to participate in all these multi-sport events.

Hosted Games
New Delhi, the national capital of India, has hosted the Asian Games on two occasions: the inaugural 1951 Asian Games and the 1982 Asian Games.

Asian Games

Medals by Games
*Red border color indicates tournament was held on home soil.
India is one of the only seven countries that have competed in all the editions of the Asian Games. The other six are Indonesia, Japan, the Philippines, Sri Lanka, Singapore and Thailand. India has won at least one gold medal at every Asian Games, and always ranked within the top 10 nations of the medal table except in the 1990 Asian Games. After completing the 2018 Asian Games, India's medal count is as follows:

A tabular form of the details of the medals won by India is as follows:

Medals by sport
Note: Board Games included Chess, Go, Bridge and Xiangqi.

Asian Winter Games

Medals by Games
India has sent athletes to every celebration of the Asian Winter Games. Through the last revision of the Games in Astana and Almaty in 2011, India has never won a medal in the Winter Games.

Asian Para Games

Medals by Games
India's count is as follows:

A tabular form of the details of the medals won by India is as follows:

Asian Indoor and Martial Arts Games

Medals by Games

Asian Beach Games

Medals by Games
India has participated in both the editions of the Asian Beach Game. In the 2008 Games, India won a total of five medals, including three gold, and ranked seventh in the final medal table. Three gold medals were won by India in the 2010 Asian Beach Games in Muscat, Oman, earning the country sixth place in the medal table.

Asian Youth Games

Medals by Games
Indian athletes competed in the inaugural Asian Youth Games in Singapore. Indian competitors earned medals in only two sports— athletics and swimming. Four of the five gold medals came from athletics and one came from the swimming competition. Aaron Agnel Dsouza was the only multiple medal winner. Dsouze won a gold in the 200 m freestyle and a bronze in the 100 m freestyle. India's membership in IOC was suspended when the 2013 games took place so Indian athletes competed in the event as independent athletes.

See also

India at the Olympics
India at the Paralympics
India at the World Games
India at the Commonwealth Games
India at the Lusofonia Games
India at the South Asian Games

Notes and references

Notes

 The National Olympic Committees are all members of the Association of National Olympic Committees (ANOC), which is also split among five continental associations: Association of National Olympic Committees of Africa, Pan American Sports Organization, Olympic Council of Asia, European Olympic Committees, and Oceania National Olympic Committees.

References